Winter Journey may refer to:

 Winter Journey (Schubert) or Winterreise, an 1828 song cycle by Franz Schubert 
 Winter Journey (2006 film), a German film
 Winter Journey (2013 film), a Russian film
 The Winter Journey (novel), a 2009 novel by Amélie Nothomb